Le Poème de la Vigne is an 11 foot tall sculpture by Gustave Doré, installed in San Francisco's Golden Gate Park, in the U.S. state of California.

References

External links
 

Golden Gate Park
Outdoor sculptures in San Francisco
Works by Gustave Doré